Pick U Up may refer to:

 "Pick U Up", a 2009 song by Adam Lambert from For Your Entertainment
 "Pick U Up", a 2019 song by Foster the People